Gabeba Baderoon (born 21 February 1969) is a South African poet and academic. She is the 2005 recipient of the Daimler Chrysler Award for South African Poetry. She lives and works in Cape Town, South Africa, and Pennsylvania, US, and serves as an assistant professor of Women's Studies and African and African American Studies at Penn State.

Early years and education
Gabeba Baderoon was born in Port Elizabeth, South Africa, on 21 February 1969. In 1989 she received her Bachelor of Arts from the University of Cape Town in English and Psychology. In 1991 she was awarded a First-class Honours degree in English from the University of Cape Town BA Honours program. She attained her Master of Arts in English with Distinction at the University of Cape Town in Postmodernist Television (Media Studies) and in 2004 completed her doctoral studies in Media Studies at the University of Cape Town, the same year spending time at the University of Sheffield, UK, as a visiting scholar. She also completed her dissertation entitled "Oblique Figures: Representations of Islam in South African Media and Culture." She divides her life between Port Elizabeth and Pennsylvania.

Poetry collections 
 The Dream in the Next Body (2005)
Notable Book of 2005 by the Sunday Independent in South Africa
Sunday Times Recommended Book
 The Museum of Ordinary Life (2005)
 A hundred silences (2006)
shortlisted for the 2007 University of Johannesburg Prize
2007 Olive Schreiner Award
 The Silence Before Speaking
 Cinnamon (2009)
 The History of Intimacy (2018)

Awards
 2005: Daimler Chrysler Award for South African Poetry
 2005: Guest Writer Fellowship at the Nordic Africa Institute
 2008: Civitella Ranieri Fellowship in Italy
 2008: Writer's Residency at the University of Witwatersrand
 2019 Media24 Books Literary Prize: Elisabeth Eybers Prize for The History of Intimacy

References

External links 
 Podcast from Badilisha Poetry X-Change
 Interview Podcast with Books Live
 Interview with the Sheffield Telegraph.
 Interview with Money Web

University of Cape Town alumni
South African women poets
Living people
1969 births